Kipsigis may refer to:

the Kipsigis people of Kenya
Kipsigis language, a Nilotic language spoken by the Kipsigis people
Kipsigis genealogical organization